Yagher is a surname. Notable people with the surname include:

 Jeff Yagher (born 1961), American actor
 Kevin Yagher (born 1962), American special effects technician, brother of Jeff

See also
 Bagher
 Yager (surname)